Bryan Roe (born 20 August 1969) is an Australian priest and former professional tennis player.

Roe, a left-handed Queenslander who played a serve and volley game, was an Australian Open junior doubles runner-up in 1987, partnering Shane Barr.

His tennis career is most noted for his main draw appearance at the 1988 Australian Open, where on grand slam debut he faced Ivan Lendl on centre court in what was the tournament's first night session at the new Flinders Park venue. Roe was competitive against the top seeded Czechoslovakian and held a set point during the second set.

Following his appearance at the 1988 Australian Open he suffered from a series of illnesses which brought an early end to his tennis career. Immediately after the tournament he was admitted to hospital with a burst appendix and peritonitis. A bowel condition then kept his out of tennis for a year and most seriously, in 1989, he was diagnosed with Guillain–Barré syndrome.

Ordained to the priesthood in 2010, Roe is the parish priest for St Benedicts' in North Lakes, Queensland.

References

External links
 
 

1969 births
Living people
Australian male tennis players
Tennis people from Queensland
Australian Roman Catholic priests
People with Guillain–Barré syndrome